Isham is a surname. Notable people with the surname include:

 Isham Baronets of Lamport Hall in the County of Northamptonshire, including:
 Sir John Isham, 1st Baronet (1582–1651)
 Sir Justinian Isham, 2nd Baronet  (1610–1675)
 Sir Thomas Isham, 3rd Baronet (1656–1681)
 Sir Justinian Isham, 4th Baronet (1658–1730)
 Sir Justinian Isham, 5th Baronet (1687–1737)
 Sir Edmund Isham, 6th Baronet (1690–1772)
 Sir Justinian Isham, 7th Baronet (1740–1818)
 Sir Charles Edmund Isham, 10th Baronet (1819–1903)
 Sir Gyles Isham, 12th Baronet (1903–1976)

 Ashley Isham (b. 1976), fashion designer
 Charles Bradford Isham (1853–1919), American historian
 Christopher Isham (b. 1944), theoretical physicist 
 Edmund Isham (1744?–1817), administrator at the University of Oxford
 Elizabeth Isham (c.1608–1654), English writer
 Euseby Isham, Rector of Lincoln College, Oxford
 Frederic S. Isham (1865–1922), American novelist and playwright
 Heyward Isham  (1926–2009), international negotiator
 John Isham (disambiguation), several people
 John William Isham (b. 1866), American vaudeville impresario 
 Mamie Lincoln Isham (1896–1938), granddaughter of Abraham Lincoln
 Mark Isham  (b. 1951), American musician
 Mary Isham, wife of William Randolph
 Norman Isham  (1864–1943), American architectural historian
 Samuel Isham  (1855–1914), American painter
 Wayne Isham  (b. 1958), video director
 Willard W. Isham (1820–1876), American politician
 William Bradley Isham (1827–1909), American banker
 Zacheus Isham (1651–1705), British clergyman and religious author

Places
 Isham, village in Northamptonshire, England
 Isham, Tennessee, unincorporated community, United States